Vehicle registration plates of Namibia are yellow fluorescent metal plates with imprints in black. The standard version is uniform throughout the country, and carries one of the following forms:

The first letter is always "N" for Namibia. The last one or two letters indicate the town or region the car originates from. In between, numbers are issued sequentially within each region, starting with single-digit numbers, and increasing in length as required. The vast majority of vehicles are registered in the capital, Windhoek, and require six digits; most other regions currently use three or four digits.

Since 2007, personalised number plates are available at an extra fee. Such plates may carry up to seven alphanumerical characters, followed by the Namibian Flag and the letters NA. They also differ in color and material, the personalised plates are made from acrylic white plastic and have light blue characters.

Government vehicles use dark green number plates with white imprints. As with ordinary number plates, numbers are issued sequentially within each region, starting with single-digit numbers, and increasing in length as required. The Government vehicle plates are prefixed with the following letters:
 GRN - Government vehicles
 NDF - Namibia Defence Force 
 POL - Police

Town codes

The following list may be incomplete.

 A - Arandis
 AR – Aranos
 B –  Bethanien
 DV - Divundu
 EN – Eenhana
 G –  Grootfontein
 GO – Gobabis
 HB - Henties Bay
 HN - Helao Nafidi (since 2022)
 K –  Keetmanshoop
 KA – Karasburg
 KH – Khorixas
 KM – Katima Mulilo
 KR – Karibib
 KO - Okongo
 L –  Lüderitz
 M –  Mariental
 MA – Maltahöhe
 MT – Omuthiya
 ND – Ondangwa
 NK - Nkurenkuru
 OA - Okahao (since 2022)
 OH – Okahandja
 OJ – Outjo
 OK – Okakarara
 OM – Omaruru
 ON – Otjinene
 OP – Opuwo
 OR – Oranjemund
 OT – Otjiwarongo
 OV – Otavi
 R –  Rehoboth
 RC – Ruacana
 RU – Rundu
 S –  Swakopmund
 SH – Oshakati
 T –  Tsumeb
 U –  Usakos
 UP – Outapi
 W –  Windhoek Capital of Namibia.
 WB – Walvis Bay

South West Africa

From 1968 to 1990, South West Africa used a system similar to that in use in South Africa, using the prefix S:

 SA –  Karasburg Now KA.
 SB –  Bethanie Now B.
 SBA – Ovamboland
 SC –  Oranjemund Now OR.
 SCA – Okavango
 SDA – Kaokoveld
 SE –  Otavi Now OV.
 SEA – Otjinene Now ON.
 SEB – Okakarara Now OK.
 SF –  Grootfontein Now G.
 SFA – Damaraland
 SH –  Okahandja Now OH.
 SJ –  Outjo Now OJ.
 SK –  Keetmanshoop Now K.
 SL – Lüderitz now L.
 SM – Maltahöhe now MA.
 SN – Mariental now M.
 SO – Otjiwarongo now OT.
 SP – Karibib now KR.
 SR – Rehoboth Now R.
 SS – Swakopmund now S.
 ST – Tsumeb now T.
 SU – Usakos now U.
 SV – Walvis Bay now WB.
 SW – Windhoek now W.
 SX – Gobabis now GO.
 SY – Omaruru now OM.
 ECZ– Caprivi Strip. The Zambezi Region now uses the code KM (Katima Mulilo).

 Walvis Bay, although legally part of the Cape Province, was long administered as part of South West Africa. During the 1980s it was returned to the Cape Province and used the code CWB. It then became part of Namibia.
 Until 1968 South West Africa used a system of one- and two-letter codes without prefixes. W stood for Windhoek, L for Lüderitz, R for Rehoboth, Sd for Swakopmund, T for Tsumeb and Wb for Walvis Bay.
 The South African Defence Force also operated in South West Africa and used the same codes (U until 1961, and then R) as in South Africa.
 South Africa's Bantu Trust also operated in South West Africa, its vehicles using the code BT, as in South Africa.

References

External links

Namibia
Road transport in Namibia
Namibia transport-related lists